Nathan J. DeLong (January 5, 1926 – May 5, 2010) was a center in the National Basketball Association (NBA).

Biography
A native of Chippewa Falls, Wisconsin, DeLong was a long-time resident of Hayward, Wisconsin. He attended the University of Wisconsin-River Falls. From 1989 to 2008, he served on the Board of Supervisors of Sawyer County, Wisconsin. He had two children.

Professional basketball career
DeLong was drafted in the ninth round of the 1950 NBA draft by the Tri-Cities Blackhawks. He later played with the franchise after it moved to Milwaukee, Wisconsin from Moline, Illinois and became the Milwaukee Hawks.

References

1926 births
2010 deaths
American men's basketball players
Basketball players from Wisconsin
Centers (basketball)
County supervisors in Wisconsin
Military personnel from Wisconsin
Milwaukee Hawks players
People from Chippewa Falls, Wisconsin
People from Hayward, Wisconsin
Tri-Cities Blackhawks draft picks
United States Navy personnel of World War II
United States Navy sailors
Wisconsin–River Falls Falcons men's basketball players